Jane F. Bramsen (born 10 September 1978) is a badminton player from Denmark.

Career
Bramsen won the gold medal at the 2002 European Badminton Championships in women's doubles with Ann-Lou Jørgensen.

References

Danish female badminton players
Living people
1978 births
Place of birth missing (living people)
20th-century Danish women